Arbela is an unincorporated community in Washington Township, Union County, Ohio, United States.

Arbela was platted on July 25, 1838 by Marquis L. Osborne. Although Arbella was initally given 40 lots, the town didn't really grow, with not much being built at the townsite.

The Arbela Post Office was established October 24, 1887, and discontinued May 31, 1907.  Mail service is now sent through the Richwood branch.

Telephone service was installed from Byhalia to Arbela in 1900.

References 

Unincorporated communities in Union County, Ohio